The Last Ottoman: Knockout Ali is a 2007 Turkish action film, directed by Mustafa Şevki Doğan based on the book by Suat Yalaz, starring Kenan İmirzalıoğlu as the titular hero Tahtacızade "Yandım" Ali, who is inspired by the landing of Mustafa Kemal at Samsun and decides to join the resistance movement fighting against the occupation of Constantinople in the aftermath of the First World War.

Production
Yandım Ali is a great hero and heroism is something which always appeals to us. Maybe we follow this path because we know the make-up of our people and know there is a majority that likes nationalist films, director Mustafa Şevki Doğan told Reuters.

The film was shot on location in Istanbul and Bahçeşehir, Turkey.

Plot
The film is set in the years after World War I when the Ottoman capital of Constantinople was under the siege by the enemy. A navy sergeant named Tahtacızade Ali (Kenan İmirzalıoğlu), who has just completed his military service, is yearning for his fiancée Defne (Cansu Dere) who married another man while Ali was away. Ali plans to abduct Defne and flee to Vienna. However, Ali's plans change when he comes across Mustafa Kemal, who has just set on a journey to save the Turkish land from the enemy. Ali recognizes that his real love is his country, and joins in the endeavors to save his country.

Main cast
Kenan İmirzalıoğlu as Tahtacızade "Yandım" Ali
Cansu Dere as Defne
Engin Şenkan as Çukurçeşmeli Osman Bey
Anna Babkova as Nadia
Alican Yücesoy as Mustafa Kemal
Baykut Badem as Kelle
Öner Erkan as Gerard (Jerar)
Kim Feenstra as Collette (French teacher)

Release

Festival Screenings
 31st Cairo International Film Festival (Nov. 27-Dec. 7, 2007)

References

External links
 Official site

2000s action war films
2007 films
Live-action films based on comics
Turkish action war films
2000s Turkish-language films
Films set in Turkey
Turkish War of Independence films